Unlearning is the second studio album by Canadian Singer/Songwriter Matt Brouwer. It was released independently in February 2005 on Brouwer's website and in digital distribution and later in stores through various distribution avenues. It's been hailed by critics as Brouwer's most honest and intimate recording to date. The album was well received by Brouwer's audience and the single "I Shall Believe" charted in the top 30 on Billboard's Christian songs chart in 2006.

Track listing

Charts

References

2005 albums
Matt Brouwer albums